Final stage or The Final Stage may refer to:
 The Final Stage, 1995 film directed by Frank Howson
 Fifth stage of a bill's passage through a legislative chamber
 In a multi-stage tournament:
 knockout stage
 playoffs
 Champs-Élysées stage in the Tour de France

See also
 Liar Game: The Final Stage 2010 Japanese film 
 The Last Stage, 1947 Polish film 
 "The Final Phase", episode four of The Space Museum, a 1965 Doctor Who television serial